Shelby High School is a public high school located at 230 E Dixon Blvd in Shelby, North Carolina. The mascot of the school is the Golden Lion.

History
Shelby High School was first mentioned in local newspapers of the time as being established in June 1877, by Professor J.A. Smith, with G.W. Sharpe and Miss Laura Sharp as instructors. Shelby moved to its current high school building location in 1960, with the dedication of the school being held on September 10, 1961.

Notable alumni
 Bill Champion, MLB pitcher
 Moe Davis, retired U.S. Air Force colonel
 Gabe DeVoe, professional basketball player
 Eddie Dodson, bank robber known as the New York Yankees Bandit
 Alvin Gentry, NBA coach
 Roger McKee, MLB pitcher
 Charlotte Smith, professional women's basketball player and current college coach
 Cliff Washburn, American football player
 Jim Washburn, NFL coach
 Robert Williams, NFL defensive back
 Tom Wright, MLB outfielder

References

Education in Cleveland County, North Carolina
Public high schools in North Carolina